Matti Rönkä (born 9 September 1959) is a Finnish TV journalist and novelist. He received the Glass Key award in 2007 for the crime novel Ystävät kaukana and the Deutscher Krimi Preis third prize in 2008 for the German translation of his novel Tappajan näköinen mies (2002). He has been the anchor of the daily news program 20:30 National Report since 2003 on Yle, thus inheriting the nickname "Suomen ääni" (English: "The Voice of Finland") from the program's old host Arvi Lind.

Bibliography 
 2002 Tappajan näköinen mies; English translation: A Man with a Killer's Face, 2017
 2003 Hyvä veli, paha veli
 2005 Ystävät kaukana 
 2007 Mies rajan takaa, an anthology comprising the three above
 2008 Isä, poika ja paha henki
 2009 Tuliaiset Moskovasta
 2011 Väärän maan vainaja

References

1959 births
Living people
Finnish male novelists
Finnish crime writers
21st-century Finnish novelists
21st-century male writers